Low's squirrel (Sundasciurus lowii) is a species of rodent in the family Sciuridae. It is found in Borneo and nearby islets (Indonesia and Malaysia). Its former subspecies S. l. robinsoni from Sumatra and Malay Peninsula and S. l. natunensis from the Natuna islands have recently been given species status

References

Sundasciurus
Rodents of Indonesia
Rodents of Malaysia
Mammals described in 1892
Taxa named by Oldfield Thomas
Taxonomy articles created by Polbot